Caryocolum blandulella is a moth of the family Gelechiidae. It is found in Great Britain, the Netherlands, Spain, France, Germany, Denmark, Finland, Sweden, Switzerland, Italy, Croatia, Hungary, Greece and Ukraine, as well as Corsica. The habitat consists of coastal sand-dunes.

The length of the forewings is 4–5 mm for males and 4-5.5 mm for females. The forewings are whitish, frequently mottled with greyish brown. There is a broad black patch from the fold to the costa at one-quarter and a black medial spot. Adults have been recorded on wing from mid-July to late August.

The larvae feed on Cerastium pumilum and possibly Cerastium semidecandrum. They feed on the seed-capsules, living between seeds spun together with silk. Larvae can be found in early June.

References

Moths described in 1887
blandulella
Moths of Europe